Momina may refer to:
Momina, Burkina Faso
Momina, Poland

See also
Momino (disambiguation)